Bao Zunxin (September 1937 – 28 October 2007) was a Chinese historian and political dissident who was arrested and jailed by the Chinese government for his role in the 1989 Tiananmen Square protests.

Biography
Born in September 1937 in Wuhu County, Anhui, China, he was a 34th-generation descendant of Bao Zheng. Bao graduated from Beijing University in 1964. He was a scholar at the History Institute of the Chinese Academy of Social Sciences. Bao also taught as a professor at Beijing Normal University.

In 1989 Bao spoke out in support of pro-democracy protesters who marched in the Tiananmen Square democracy protests. Bao also signed a petition which declared that China was still ruled by an emperor. The "emperor" which the declaration referred to was the supposedly retired Chinese Communist Party leader Deng Xiaoping.

Bao was arrested after the Tiananmen Square massacre, and was charged with "counterrevolutionary propaganda and incitement." He was sentenced to 5 years in prison for his participation in the pro-democracy movement. He served 3 and a half years of his sentence before being released in November 1992.

Death
Bao died of a brain hemorrhage at the Dongfang Hospital Beijing University of Chinese Medicine, Fengtai District, Beijing on October 28, 2007. He was 70 years old.

Notes

1937 births
2007 deaths
People's Republic of China historians
Chinese dissidents
Peking University alumni
Prisoners and detainees of the People's Republic of China
People from Wuhu
Historians from Anhui
20th-century Chinese historians
1989 Tiananmen Square protests and massacre